Oberleichtersbach is a municipality in the district of Bad Kissingen in Bavaria in Germany.

Divisions of the municipality
The municipality includes the following towns:
Oberleichtersbach
Unterleichtersbach
Modlos
Breitenbach
Mitgenfeld

History
In 1803 the Bishopric of Fulda, of which Oberleichtersbach was a part, was secularized and given to Willem Frederik, Prince of Orange-Nassau. In 1806, after his defeat at the Battle of Jena–Auerstedt, the Principality of Nassau-Orange-Fulda was absorbed into France and its vassal state Grand Duchy of Frankfurt. In the Congress of Vienna in 1815, it was given to Bavaria.

Population

Coat of arms
Quartered with 1 and 4 in silver with a cross; 2 and 3 divided diagonally gold and red.

Economy
In 1998, there were 428 businesses in the municipality. In 1999, there were 84 agricultural businesses, with 2091 ha under cultivation, 788 ha in fields, and 1296 ha in pasture.

References

External links
Official website

Bad Kissingen (district)